The Neuwarper See, also Warper See is a bay on the southern shore of the Szczecin Lagoon. It runs for about 6 kilometres into the interior and has two narrow channels to the lagoon in the north that are each only 150 metres wide and divided by a small island of reeds.

The west and south shores of the bay belong to the district of Vorpommern-Greifswald in the German federal state of Mecklenburg-Vorpommern, the east shore is part of the Polish West Pomeranian Voivodeship (Police County).

Passenger ferries run between Altwarp and Neuwarp all year round (6 trips each way from 10:00 to 17:30).

References

External links 

Bays of Mecklenburg-Western Pomerania
Vorpommern-Greifswald
Landforms of West Pomeranian Voivodeship
Bays of Poland